Chlodwigplatz is a station on the Cologne Stadtbahn lines 15 and 16 and 17, located in the Cologne district of Neustadt-Süd. The station lies on Chlodwigplatz (part of the Cologne Ring), after which it is named. 

The station consists of two side platforms with two rail tracks on the surface, and an Island platform with two tracks in the underground. Once the North-South Stadtbahn is finished, lines 5 and 16 will operate through the tunnel, serving the underground station.

See also 
 List of Cologne KVB stations

External links 
 station info page 
 station layout diagram

Cologne KVB stations
Innenstadt, Cologne